50th State Big Time Wrestling (sometimes referred to as NWA Hawaii or Mid-Pacific Promotions) was a professional wrestling promotion headquartered in Honolulu, Hawaii in the United States that promoted professional wrestling matches throughout Hawaii. The promotion was founded by Al Karasick in 1936 and became a member of the National Wrestling Alliance in 1949. In 1961, Karasick sold the promotion to  "Gentleman" Ed Francis. Along with his business partner Lord James Blears, Francis created a "golden age" of professional wrestling in Hawaii that lasted throughout the 1960s and early 1970s, with 50th State Big Time Wrestling becoming one of Hawaii's most-watched programs. The promotion came to an end in 1979 when Francis sold his interest to Steve Rickard.

History
Mid-Pacific Promotions was founded in 1936 by Russian emigrant Al Karasick. Assisted by booker Bobby Bruns, Karasick staged weekly shows in Honolulu's Civic Auditorium, which he managed. Thanks to Hawaii's tropical climate, Mid-Pacific Promotions emerged as a popular destination for wrestlers looking for a "working vacation", with high-profile wrestlers such as Lou Thesz and Rikidōzan visiting Hawaii. In 1949, Karasick joined the National Wrestling Alliance. In the early-1950s, Karasick began expanding into Japan, lobbying NWA president Sam Muchnick to recognise Japan as his territory. By the 1960s, Hawaii was established as a hub for American wrestlers travelling to and from Japan.

In 1961, Karasick retired from promoting, selling the territory to "Gentleman" Ed Francis, who rebranded it "50th State Big Time Wrestling". Francis continued promoting weekly Wednesday shows at the Civic Auditorium, with the venue regularly sold-out. Shortly after Francis took over the promotion, a bout between Native Hawaiian wrestler King Curtis Iaukea and Samoan wrestler Neff Maiava resulted in a violent riot. Francis appointed Lord James Blears as booker, with Blears quickly gaining a name for his "outrageous" and "goofy" characters. The promotion's top stars included Johnny Barend, Curtis Iaukea, Don Muraco, Neff Maiava, Peter Maivia, and Sammy Steamboat. The promotion helped introduce several concepts that later became ubiquitous in professional wrestling, including the steel cage match and the backstage interview. Johnny Barend became infamous for his outlandish interviews, which began with him emerging from a coffin while smoking a cigar. In 1967, Barend married Annie Lum in the ring at the Honolulu International Center shortly before a title match.

Francis secured a Saturday afternoon live television slot on KHVH-TV. As the promotion increased in popularity, it moved to KGMB and increased its output to two programs a week: a taped show featuring interviews, vignettes and replays on Friday nights and a live show on Saturday afternoons. Hosted by Francis and Blears, 50th State Wrestling was at one point the most watched television program in Hawaii. Television tapings rotated between Hawaii, Kauai, and Maui. 

After the Civic Coliseum closed in 1974, Francis ceased promoting for three years. In June 1977, he revived the promotion in the Honolulu International Center. With costs rising and revenues falling, Francis sold the promotion to Steve Rickard in 1979. With Francis no longer promoting, Verne Gagne's American Wrestling Association expanded into Hawaii.

Championships

Alumni
 Johnny Barend
 Dick Beyer
 Joe Blanchard
 Lord James Blears
 Nick Bockwinkel
 Russ Francis
 Mr. Fujiwara
 Giant Baba
 Ripper Collins
 Hard Boiled Haggerty
 King Curtis Iaukea
 Killer Kowalski
 Pampero Firpo
 Neff Maiava
 The Missing Link
 Sweet Daddy Siki
 Sammy Steamboat
 Ray Stevens
 Tosh Togo
 Maurice Vachon
 Bill Watts
 Billy White Wolf

Works
 Ed Francis (2012) Gentleman Ed Francis Presents: 50th State Big Time Wrestling!

Footnotes

External links
 50th State Big Time Wrestling
 Mid-Pacific Promotions at WrestlingTitles.com

 
1936 establishments in Hawaii
1979 disestablishments in the United States
Companies based in Honolulu
National Wrestling Alliance members
Professional wrestling in Hawaii